Asura spinata is a moth of the family Erebidae. It was described by Lars Kühne in 2007. It is found in Kenya and the Democratic Republic of the Congo.

References

Moths described in 2007
spinata
Moths of Africa